Indiana Dunes National Park is a National Park Service unit on the shore of Lake Michigan in Indiana, United States. A BioBlitz took place there on May 15 and 16, 2009. During that time, a list of organisms was compiled which included a preliminary listing of the (freshwater) fish of the area.

List of fish species

Invasive Species
 Alosa pseudoharengus - Alewife
Unclassified
 Chaenobryttus gulosus - Warmouth
Pickerel
 Esox americanus - American pickerel
Darters
 Etheostoma exile - Iowa darter
Sunfish
 Lepomis cyanellus - Green sunfish
 Lepomis gibbosus - Pumpkinseed
Bass
 Micropterus salmoides - Largemouth bass
Goby
 Neogobius melanostomus - Round goby
Shiners
 Cyprinella spiloptera - Spotfin Shiner
 Notropis atherinoides - Emerald shiner
 Notropis hudsonius - Spottail shiner
 Notropis stramineus - Sand shiner
 Notropis volucellus - Mimic shiner
 Notemigonus crysoleucas - Golden shiner
Salmon
 Oncorhynchus kisutch - Coho salmon
 Oncorhynchus mykiss - Rainbow trout
 Oncorhynchus tshawytscha - Chinook salmon
Minnow
 Umbra limi - Central mudminnow

Fishing areas
 Portage Lakefront and Riverwalk.  There is a new (2009) fishing pier along the breakwall for the Burns Waterway entry.  This area has been noted for small mouth bass, carp, catfish, salmon, and trout.
 Long Lake is accessed through the West Beach entrance on Lake and Porter County Line Road.  It is known for large mouth bass, and bluegill.
 Salt Creek at the junction of the East Branch of the Little Calumet River.  Difficult to get to in Burns Harbor, this area has produced large mouth bass, salmon, and trout.

Notes

Indiana Dunes
Fish of the Indiana Dunes
.Indiana
.Indiana